The M270 and M274 are turbocharged Inline-four engines produced by Mercedes-Benz since 2011. They are the successor to the previous M266 and M271 engines respectively. The engine appeared on the Ward's 10 Best Engines list for 2017.

Design 
M270 refers to the transverse configuration for front-wheel drive vehicles, while M274 refers to the longitudinally-mounted layout for rear-wheel drive vehicles. Both engines are based on the same design with dual overhead camshafts, 4 valves per cylinder, variable valve timing, direct injection, and compliance with the EU6 emissions standard. The M274 engine was also used on the Infiniti Q50 since 2014.

M270 engine

M270 DE16 LA R 
75 kW version
 2015–2018 W176 A160
 2015–2018 W246 B160

90 kW version
 2011–2018 W246 B180
 2012–2018 W176 A180
 2013–2019 C117 CLA180
 2015–2019 X156 GLA180

M270 DE16 LA 
 2011–2018 W246 B200
 2012–2018 W176 A200
 2013–2019 C117 CLA200
 2014–2019 X156 GLA200

M270 DE20 LA 
115 kW version
 2013–2018 W246 B200 Natural Gas Drive

135 kW version
 2013–2018 W246 B220 4MATIC
 2014–2018 W176 A220 4MATIC
 2016–2018 C117 CLA220 4MATIC

155 kW version
 2012–2018 W176 A250
 2012–2018 W246 B250
 2013–2019 C117 CLA250
 2013–2019 X156 GLA250
 2015–2019 Infiniti Q30
 2016–2019 Infiniti QX30

160 kW version
 2015–2018 W176 A250 Sport
 2015–2019 C117 CLA250 Sport

M274 engine

M274 DE16 LA 
95 kW version
 2015–2019 W205 C160

115 kW version
 2012–2013 W204 C180
2014–2019 W205 C180
 2013–2016 W212 E180

M274 DE20 LA 
115 kW version
 2013–2016 W212 E200 Natural Gas Drive

135 kW version
 2013–2016 W212 E200
 2013–2016 X204 GLK200
 2014–2018 W205 C200
 2015–2020 R172 SLK/SLC200
 2016–present W213 E200

155 kW version
 2013–2016 W212 E250
 2013–2016 X204 GLK250
2016–2019 X253 GLC250 4MATIC
 2014–2018 W205 C250
 2015–2018 W205 C350e
2018–present W205 C300e
 2015–2019 V37 Q50/Nissan Skyline (2014-2019; 200GT-t DBA-ZV37/DBA-YV37)
 2016–2018 W213 E250
 2016–2018 W213 E350e
2018–present W213 E300e
 2015–2019 X253 GLC350e 4MATIC
2019–present X253 GLC300e 4MATIC
 2016–present Mercedes-Benz V-Class (Chinese market; known as the M274 920)
 2016-2023 Mercedes-Benz Metris (W447)
 2016–present CV37 Q60
 2015–2019 Y51 Q70

180 kW version
 2015–2018 W205 C300
 2015–2018 W213 E300
 2015–2019 R172 SLC300
 2015–2019 X253 GLC300 / GLC300 4MATIC

References 

Mercedes-Benz engines
Straight-four engines
Gasoline engines by model